The 94th Division was a unit of the United States Army in World War I, and of the Organized Reserve Corps in 1921 until 1942.

The 94th Infantry Division was a unit of the United States Army in World War II, and of the United States Army Reserve from 1956 until 1963. It continued in the Army Reserve as the 94th Command Headquarters (Divisional) from 1963 until the Army's realignment of reserve component combat arms into the Army National Guard in 1967.

The 94th Army Reserve Command (later redesignated 94th Regional Support Command and 94th Regional Readiness Command) was a regional command and control headquarters over most United States Army Reserve units throughout the six New England states of Maine, Massachusetts, Vermont, New Hampshire, Connecticut, and Rhode Island. For forty years, beginning in the late 1960s, the United States Army Reserve was divided up into a varying number of regional, branch-immaterial commands. Originally designated "army reserve commands" ("ARCOMs"), several were disbanded in and around 1995, while the remainder were redesignated "regional support commands" ("RSCs") at that time and re-dubbed "regional readiness commands" ("RRCs") in 2001. In addition to the RRCs, several mission-oriented commands were established, including such as training divisions and engineer commands. Like most RRCs, the 94th Regional Readiness Command was scheduled to be deactivated in fiscal year 2009 as part of the Army Reserve's reorganization into a functionally based command structure reporting to respective major Army commands ("MACOMs"); plans were altered, the 94th became a training division headquartered at Fort Lee.

The 94th ARCOM/RSC/RRC wore the shoulder sleeve insignia of the 94th Infantry Division but did not, according to the United States Army Center of Military History, perpetuate the lineage of the old division and was thus not entitled to the division's battle honors, as it is against Army policy for TDA organizations, such as ARCOMs, RSCs and RRCs, to perpetuate the lineage of TO&E units, such as infantry divisions.  Army Regulation 840-10 dictates that the distinguishing flag of an RRC features a white-bordered, 38.1 cm (15 in.) tall rendering of the shoulder sleeve insignia on a plain blue background, rather than on the horizontally divided bi-colour background of red over blue as carried by an infantry division.

Although the 94th RRC did not carry the lineage of the 94th Infantry Division, today's 94th Military Police Company (formerly under the 94th RRC) carries the lineage of the World War II Military Police Platoon, 94th Infantry Division. The 94th Military Police Company also served in Desert Storm, Bosnia, and most recently Iraq. In 2003-04 the 94th MPs added a battle streamer to their guidon when they were awarded the Valorous Unit Award for their actions in al-Anbar, hunting Iraqi Ba'ath members after the collapse of government and conducting Counter-Insurgency Operations against the increasing militant uprisings in Al-Qaim, Rutbah, Haditha, Baghdad, Ramadi and Fallujah. The 94th MPs were also awarded The "Order of the Spur" by Colonel Teeples of the 3d Armored Cavalry Regiment (3CR), as a nod to the combat action of the 94th Military Police Company during their mission with the 3d Cavalry Regiment. The history and spirit of the Military Police Platoon, 94th Infantry Division of World War II lives on with them.

The 94th Division (Force Sustainment) is a unit of the United States Army Reserve, charged with providing sustainment training throughout the United States. The division is based at Fort Lee, Virginia and is subordinate to the 80th Training Command. The division has subordinate brigades that perform military occupational specialty (MOS) reclassification training. The division has brigades in the Continental United States and a multi-functional brigade in Puerto Rico. The 94th Infantry Division's standard (flag) and lineage bestowed upon the 94th Division (Force Sustainment) at its activation in 2009.

World War I
The 94th started as a provisional division in 1918. It was originally going to be formed as the 94th (Puerto-Rico) Division, based in Puerto Rico and composed of Spanish-speaking troops. However, the US Army lacked enough Spanish-speaking instructors to train the necessary support and technical services units, so it was agreed to create it as a "paper" division like the 93rd. The infantry regiments were assigned numbers 373 through 376, which would have been associated with the National Army's 94th Division. Only the 373rd–375th Infantry Regiments were formed. With the close of World War I, the division was disbanded. One of the Division's nicknames, the "Neuf-Cats" most likely comes from this era as most World War I combat was set in France, and the number '94' was pronounced in French as "Neuf-Quatre", literally, "Nine-Four". As the French numeral "Quatre" is pronounced as the English "cat", the division decided to adopt this as a nickname and pluralized it.

Inter-war years

In 1921 the 94th Division was reconstituted as an element of the Organized Reserve ("OR") and nicknamed the "Pilgrim Division" in reference to the rich cultural history of the state of Massachusetts to which it was assigned. The headquarters was organized in November 1921. A shoulder sleeve insignia featuring a Native American with bow and arrow was authorized on 21 July 1922. This design was superseded 6 September 1923 by one depicting the black silhouette of a Puritan carrying a blunderbuss on his shoulder, on a gray circle (the wording of the new design's description was amended on 22 December of the same year).

Like the other OR divisions, the 94th was an authorized only a cadre organisation of officers and men; even then, the OR units were perpetually under-strength and received little equipment or funds with which to train.

World War II

Re-formed 

The 94th Division, like the other divisions of the Organized Reserve was not mobilized as a complete unit. In August 1940, the officers and men of the Organized Reserve had been called to active duty individually, being disbursed to existing Regular Army and Army National Guard units. The majority of mid-level officers (captains through lieutenant colonels) in the U.S. Army during the Second World War were Reserve officers. As such, the 94th provided leaders to every theater in the war.

With virtually all of the division's personnel having gone off to war without it, the 94th Division existed only on paper when its shoulder sleeve insignia was changed on 5 September 1942 to a half-black, half-gray circle with the Arabic numerals 9 and 4 superimposed in reverse colors. Ten days later, on 15 September 1942, the division was ordered into active military service as the 94th Infantry Division at Fort Custer near Kalamazoo, Michigan. To effect the initial organization of the 94th, the officer cadre below regimental level and the entire enlisted cadre was selected from the soldiers of the 77th Infantry Division, then stationed at Fort Jackson, South Carolina.

Order of battle

 Headquarters, 94th Infantry Division
 301st Infantry Regiment 
 302nd Infantry Regiment
 376th Infantry Regiment 
The 376th Infantry Regiment receiving the honor of being the first to qualify Expert Infantry Regiment in US military history
 Headquarters and Headquarters Battery, 94th Infantry Division Artillery
 301st Field Artillery Battalion (105 mm)	
 356th Field Artillery Battalion (105 mm)		
 390th Field Artillery Battalion (155 mm)
 919th Field Artillery Battalion (105 mm)
 319th Engineer Combat Battalion
 319th Medical Battalion
 94th Cavalry Reconnaissance Troop (Mechanized)
 Headquarters, Special Troops, 94th Infantry Division
 Headquarters Company, 94th Infantry Division
 794th Ordnance Light Maintenance Company
 94th Quartermaster Company
 94th Signal Company
 Military Police Platoon
 Band
 94th Counterintelligence Corps Detachment

Statistics
Called into federal service: 15 September 1942, Fort Custer, Michigan 
Overseas: 6 August 1944.
Campaigns: Northern France, Rhineland, Ardennes-Alsace, Central Europe
Days of combat: 209 
Awards:
 Unit
 1 Presidential Unit Citation
 Individual
 1 Medal of Honor
 54 Distinguished Service Crosses
 2 Distinguished Service Medals
 510 Silver Stars
 10 Legions of Merit
 12 Soldier's Medals
 2792 Bronze Star Medals
 66 Air Medals
Commanders:
 Major General Harry J. Malony (1 July 1942 through 30 June 1945)	
 Brigadier General Louis J. Fortier (30 June 1945 through 31 July 1945)
 Major General Allison J. Barnett (1 August 1945 through 9 February 1946)
Returned to U.S.: 6 February 1946
Inactivated: 7 February 1946 at Camp Kilmer, New Jersey

Combat chronicle
Following a brief stay in England, the 94th landed on Utah Beach, France on D-Day + 94, 8 September 1944, and moved into Brittany to relieve the 6th Armored Division and assume responsibility for containing some 60,000 German troops besieged in their garrisons at the Channel ports of Lorient and Saint-Nazaire. The 94th inflicted over 2,700 casualties on the enemy and took 566 prisoners before being relieved by the 66th Infantry Division on New Year's Day 1945.

As part of General George Patton's United States Third Army, the 94th Infantry Division ("94th ID") was known as "Patton's Golden Nugget". Moving east, the division relieved the 90th Infantry Division on 7 January 1945, taking positions in the Saar-Moselle Triangle south of Wasserbillig, facing the Siegfried Switch Line. Fresh for the fight, the 94th shifted to the offensive, 14 January, seizing Tettingen and Butzdorf that day. The following day, the Nennig-Berg-Wies area was wrested from the enemy, severe counterattacks followed, and it was at Nennig that the Germans gave the division its nickname "Roosevelt's Butchers" for stacking the dead in houses and along roads and refusing prisoners, lacking the means to guard and transport them. Butzdorf, Berg, and most of Nennig changed hands several times before being finally secured. On the 20th, an unsuccessful battalion attack against Orscholz, eastern terminus of the switch position, resulted in loss of most of two companies. In early February, the division took Campholz Woods and seized Sinz. On 19 February 1945, supported by heavy artillery and air support, the division launched a full-scale attack with all three regiments, storming the heights of Munzigen Ridge, to breach the Siegfried Line switch-line defenses and clear the Berg-Munzingen Highway.

Moving forward, the 94th Infantry Division and the 10th Armored Division secured the area from Orscholz and Saarburg to the confluence of the Saar and Moselle Rivers by 21 February 1945. At Ayl, General Patton ordered troops to cross the Saar immediately, against the advice of many of his officers. Under command of Lieutenant Colonel William A. McNulty, the 94th's 3rd Battalion, 301st Infantry Regiment crossed the icy and swollen Saar on 23 February 1945.

Despite Lt. Col. McNulty's own preparatory reconnaissance in absence of other adequate intelligence and undertaken at considerable personal risk, many men and materiel were lost during the very ill-prepared Saar crossing. Two of the three crossings sites were eventually abandoned due to heavy and pinpoint German artillery and machinegun fire. After establishing a bridgehead at Serrig, the 376th Infantry Regiment was detached to assist the 10th Armored Division in the capture of Trier. By 2 March 1945, the division stretched over a 10-mile front, from Hocker Hill on the Saar through Zerf, and Lampaden to Ollmuth. A heavy German attack near Lampaden achieved penetrations, but the line was shortly restored, and on 13 March, spearheading XX Corps, the division broke out of the Ruwer River bridgehead by ford and bridge. Driving forward, the 94th reached the Rhine on 21 March, where it fought in the Battle for Ludwigshafen. Ludwigshafen was taken on 24 March, in conjunction with Combat Command A of the 12th Armored Division.

The division then moved by rail and motor to the vicinity of Krefeld, Germany, relieving the 102nd Infantry Division on 3 April and assuming responsibility for containing the western side of the Ruhr Pocket from positions along the Rhine. With the reduction of the pocket in mid-April, the division was assigned military government duties, first in the Krefeld and later in the Düsseldorf areas.

By mid-April, the division relieved the 101st Airborne Division and assumed military government duties, first in the Krefeld vicinity and later around Düsseldorf. It was in that status when hostilities were declared at an end on 7 May 1945. From mid-June until the end of November, the division served the military government in Czechoslovakia.

The 94th Infantry Division was inactivated at Camp Kilmer, New Jersey on 9 February 1946.

Casualties
Total battle casualties: 6,533
Killed in action: 1,009
Wounded in action: 4,789
Missing in action: 116
Prisoner of war: 619

Assignments in ETO
 27 July 1944: XIII Corps, Ninth Army.
 28 August 1944: XIII Corps, Ninth Army, 12th Army Group.
 23 September 1944: Ninth Army, 12th Army Group.
 9 October 1944: 12th Army Group.
 5 January 1945: 12th Army Group, but attached to Oise Section, Communication Zone, for supply.
 6 January 1945: XX Corps, Third Army, 12th Army Group.
 29 March 1945: XII Corps, Fifteenth Army, 12th Army Group.

Cold War

94th Infantry Division
The division was reactivated in the United States Army Reserve in 1956. On 14 May of that year, the "9/4" shoulder sleeve insignia was rescinded, and the former Puritan shoulder sleeve insignia (with a minor change in the design) was reinstated.

94th Command Headquarters (Divisional)
The division was redesignated the 94th Command Headquarters (Divisional) on 16 October 1963, and was deactivated in 1967 as part of the compromise between U.S. Secretary of Defense Robert S. McNamara who wanted to merge the Army Reserve into the Army National Guard, and the United States Congress who wanted to maintain the Army Reserve as it then existed. Under the compromise plan, all of the combat divisions and most separate combat brigades of the Army Reserve were deactivated with a corresponding increase in the National Guard; at the same time, non-divisional combat support and combat service support units were reallocated in the Army Reserve.

94th Army Reserve Command

Under the aforementioned compromise plan agreed to by the Congress and the Defense Department, the fourteen area corps were deactivated; in their place, eighteen army reserve commands ("ARCOMs") were established. Commanded by a reserve major general, each ARCOM served as a regional non-tactical peacetime headquarters for unrelated support units. Each ARCOM was, in turn, assigned to one of five continental U.S. armies ("CONUSAs") under Continental Army Command ("CONARC"). On 22 April 1968, the number and shoulder-sleeve insignia of the former 94th Division were re-allocated to the new 94th U.S. Army Reserve Command ("ARCOM"), headquartered at Hanscom Air Force Base, Massachusetts and subordinate to First United States Army.

Two company-level units within the 94th ARCOM served in the Vietnam War: Headquarters & Headquarters Company, 513th Maintenance Battalion (Direct Support); and the 241st Military Intelligence Detachment.

94th ARCOM units participated annually in Exercise REFORGER (from REturn of FORces to GERmany) and Operation Bright Star throughout the Cold War. These exercises were intended to ensure that NATO and the United States military had the ability to quickly deploy forces to West Germany and Egypt in the event of a conflict with the Soviet Union.

In 1980, the peacetime Army Reserve chain of command was overlaid with a CAPSTONE wartime trace. In an expansion of the roundout and affiliation program begun ten years earlier, CAPSTONE purported to align every Army Reserve unit with the active and reserve component units with which they were anticipated to deploy. Units maintained lines of communication with the units—often hundreds or thousands of miles away in peacetime—who would presumably serve above or below them in the event of mobilization. This communication, in some cases, extended to coordinated annual training opportunities.

Many of the 94th's units and individual soldiers rotated through Honduras in the 1980s. Operation Fuertes Caminos ("strong roads") provided villagers with roads on which to move their crops to market, while providing invaluable real-world training and experience to reserve engineers, medical personnel, logisticians and others.

Operation Nordic Shield was held in the summer of 1987. Units of the 94th ARCOM; principally the 187th Infantry Brigade (Separate), the 167th Support Group (Corps) and their subordinate battalions and companies; deployed to Canadian Forces Base Gagetown in southern New Brunswick, to simulate the defense of Iceland against Warsaw Pact forces, the CAPSTONE mission of both the 187th and 167th.

Units under the 94th Army Reserve Command participated in a series of mobilization exercises in the 1980s, including the Selected Reserve Call-Up (23–25 October 1987), Golden Thrust '88 (November 1988), and Proud Eagle 90 (12 October through 2 November 1989). Each of these was designed to evaluate not only the units' ability to prepare to mobilize, but to examine the mobilization processes, systems, and logistical coordination so as to find and correct the unanticipated flaws.

In 1990–1991, over 1,000 soldiers from the 94th ARCOM served overseas in support of Operation Desert Shield and Desert Storm. Despite the commonly held belief that CAPSTONE traces were set in stone, the process of selecting units to mobilize and deploy largely ignored CAPSTONE.

Post Cold War

94th Regional Support Command

The ARCOM's Puritan shoulder sleeve insignia reverted again to the "9/4" design on 27 November 1991.

Operation Nordic Shield II was held in the summer of 1992. As they did five years before, units of the 94th ARCOM; principally the 187th Infantry Brigade (Separate), the 167th Support Group (Corps) and their subordinate battalions and companies; deployed to Canadian Forces Base Gagetown in southern New Brunswick, to simulate the defense of Iceland against Warsaw Pact forces, the CAPSTONE mission of both the 187th and 167th. Part of the 1992 exercise included lanes training as part of the United States Army Forces Command's "Bold Shift" initiative to reinforce unit war-fighting task proficiency.

In 1995, the 94th ARCOM was redesignated the 94th Regional Support Command (RSC) and moved from Hanscom Air Force Base to Fort Devens, Massachusetts.

The 94th RSC deployed soldiers to Honduras and Guatemala in 1999 in support of Operation New Horizon, and later to the Balkans in support of Operation Joint Guardian and Operation Joint Forge. Continuing with Operation New Horizon, the command deployed members of the 94th Military Police Company to Rambala-Bocas del Toro, Panamá in spring 2007.

Global War on Terror
After 11 September 2001, the 94th RSC deployed soldiers in support of Operations Noble Eagle, Enduring Freedom and Iraqi Freedom. Mission areas include Continental United States ("CONUS"), Afghanistan, Uzbekistan, Iraq, Kuwait, the Horn of Africa and Guantanamo Bay, Cuba.

The 804th Medical Brigade, a major subordinate command of the 94th Regional Support Command, mobilized at Fort Devens and trained for combat in support of operations in Kuwait (and eventually Iraq) at Fort Drum, New York in February 2003. The 804th arrived in Kuwait in March 2003 and assumed command and control of over 4400 soldiers in five countries in support of both Operation Iraqi Freedom and Operation Enduring Freedom. In mid-February 2004 the 804th arrived back at Fort Devens after successfully completing an over 12-month activation. The 804th conducted a relief-in-place/transfer-of-authority with the 8th Medical Brigade from New York City.

In December 2002, the 94th RSC moved into its final headquarters at Fort Devens, Massachusetts.

94th Regional Readiness Command
In August 2003, the 94th RSC was redesignated the 94th Regional Readiness Command (RRC).

At its end, the 94th Regional Readiness Command was made up of more than 6,000 citizen-soldiers serving within fifty-six units located throughout New England.

The 94th RRC mobilized and deployed over twenty units and more than 2,500 soldiers in support of the Global War on Terror.

94th Division rebirth in the 21st century

In September 2008, the 94th Training Division (Force Sustainment) entered "carrier status", under the command of Brigadier General Mark Corson, at Ft. Lee, Virginia. The division is one of three major divisions under the umbrella of the 80th Training Command (The Army School System), the third-largest command organization in the U.S. Army Reserve.

On 17 October 2009, the 94th Training Division was reactivated, under the command of Brigadier General Karen LeDoux, at Ft. Lee, Virginia. The activation ceremony included many of the veterans of who served in the 94th Infantry Division during World War II. The event included the 3rd Infantry Regiment (The Old Guard) and its Fife and Drum Corps.

The 94th Training Division's original red and blue colors flown by the division during World War II were returned by Army Heraldry.

Subordinate units 

As of 2018 the following units are subordinated to the 94th Training Division (Force Sustainment):

 1st Brigade (Quartermaster)
 8-80th Battalion (Quartermaster)
 9-95th Battalion (Quartermaster)
 7-100th Battalion (Quartermaster)
 8-104th Battalion (Quartermaster)
 9-108th Battalion (Quartermaster)
 2nd Brigade (Transport)
 80th Battalion (Transport)
 95th Battalion (Transport)
 100th Battalion (Transport)
 104th Battalion (Transport)
 108th Battalion (Transport)
 3rd Brigade (Ordnance)
 80th Battalion (Ordnance)
 95th Battalion (Ordnance)
 98th Battalion (Ordnance)
 100th Training Battalion (Ordnance)
 108th Training Battalion (Ordnance)
 4th Brigade (Personnel Services)
 95th Battalion (Personnel Services)
 98th Battalion (Personnel Services)
 100th Battalion (Personnel Services)
 104th Battalion (Personnel Services)
 108th Battalion (Personnel Services)
 5th Brigade (Health Services)
 11-98th Battalion (Health Services)
 10-95th Battalion (Health Services)
 8-100th Battalion (Health Services)
 10-108th Battalion (Health Services)
 9-104th Battalion (Health Services)

Insignia

Shoulder sleeve insignia (SSI)
 Native American design: Featured a Native American with bow and arrow.
 Puritan design:
 Description: On a disc silver gray, edged with a .32 cm (1/8-inch) black border, depicting the black silhouette of a Puritan carrying a flintlock blunderbuss on his shoulder.  (This insignia was derisively referred to by some as the "Puking Pilgrim".)
 Symbolism:  Being organized in New England, the armed Puritan symbolized colonial era militiamen who were the figurative (and, in some cases, literal) ancestors of the division's soldiers.  
 "9/4" design:
 Description: a black Arabic numeral "9" on the silver gray and a silver gray Arabic numeral "4" on the black. The diameter is 6.35 cm (2½ in.).
 Symbolism: The insignia represents the numerical designation of the unit.

 Background:
 A design featuring a Native American with bow and arrow was authorized for the 94th Division on 21 July 1922.
 The above design was superseded by approval of the design of a Puritan carrying a blunderbuss on his shoulder on 6 September 1923.
 The above approval was amended to change the wording of the description on 22 December 1923.
 The Puritan design was superseded by design featuring the Arabic numerals "9" and "4" on 5 September 1942.
 The "9/4" design was rescinded (canceled) on 14 May 1956. The same letter reinstated the Puritan shoulder sleeve insignia, with a minor change in the design, for the 94th Infantry Division.
 The Puritan design was redesignated for the 94th Command Headquarters (Divisional) on 16 October 1963.
 The Puritan design was authorized for the 94th Army Reserve Command on 22 April 1968.
 The Puritan design was rescinded (canceled) on 27 November 1991. The same letter reinstated the "9/4" design.
 The insignia was redesignated effective 16 July 2003 for the 94th Regional Readiness Command.

Distinctive unit insignia (DUI)
 Description: A gold color metal and enamel device, 2.86 cm (1⅛ in.) high overall, consisting of a nonagon divided diagonally from lower left to upper right, the upper area light gray and the lower area black, bearing overall a blue oblong with long axis vertical, charged with a gold silhouette of the bust of a Puritan with flintlock blunderbuss on his shoulder.
 Symbolism: The diagonally divided gray and black background refers to the shoulder sleeve insignia worn by the 94th Infantry Division during World War II, and by the 94th ARCOM/RSC/RRC in 1991–2009. The geometric four-sided figure commemorates the four European campaign honors. Blue is the color used for infantry. The bust of the Puritan with flintlock blunderbuss is from the shoulder sleeve insignia worn during the period 1923–1942 and 1956–1991. It represents the history and traditions of the area with which past and present organizations have always identified. The nine sides of the device and the four sides of the oblong also allude to the numerical designation of the unit.
 Background: The distinctive unit insignia was originally authorized for the 94th U.S. Army Reserve Command on 4 June 1970. It was reassigned and authorized for 94th U.S. Army Regional Support Command on 16 April 1996. The insignia was redesignated effective 16 July 2003 for the U.S. Army 94th Regional Readiness Command.

Nicknames
 "Pilgrim Division" (pre-World War II)
 "Neuf-Cats" (official, derived from the French "neuf quatre", meaning "nine four")
 "Patton's Golden Nugget" (unofficial while assigned to Third U.S. Army in 1945)
 "Roosevelt's Bloody Butchers" (unofficial German nickname)

Legacy
 Until the re-merger of the division's and division HHC's lineages with those of the reserve command and reserve command HHC, only the Londonderry, New Hampshire-based 94th Military Police Company, retained direct lineage to the 94th Infantry Division's organic structure.
 In 1963, a separate infantry brigade was organized in the US Army Reserve using the lineage of the division's 1st Brigade. As a separate brigade, however, it was granted its own shoulder sleeve insignia. The 187th Infantry Brigade was inactivated in 1994.
 State Highway 94 in Colorado, Connecticut, New Jersey, New York, and Pennsylvania are numbered after the 94th Infantry Division.
 Interstate 94 (I-94) in southwestern Michigan is named the 94th Infantry Division Highway. It runs past Fort Custer where the division was formed and trained during World War II.
The 94th Infantry Division also has a World War II reenacting unit by the same name. The 94th Infantry Living History Alliance was formed in 2004 and has been working with the veterans and divisional histories to accurately portray the division. They are honored by the 94th Infantry veterans and alliance as being Division's official living historians.

Popular culture
The movie "Everyman's War" (Thad T. Smith, 2009) is about a platoon of the 94th Infantry Division near Saint-Nazaire (France) in September 1944 and during the battle of the Bulge.

References

The Army Almanac: A Book of Facts Concerning the Army of the United States U.S. Government Printing Office, 1950 at http://www.history.army.mil/html/forcestruc/cbtchron/cbtchron.html
"On the Way: The Story of the 94th Infantry Division"
James T Currie and Richard B. Crossland, Twice The Citizen: A History of the United States Army Reserve, 1908–1995, Second and Expanded Edition, Washington, D.C.: U.S. Government Printing Office (1997).
 94th Infantry Division Association
 
94th Infantry Living History Alliance

External links
Fact Sheet of the 94th Infantry Division from http://www.battleofthebulge.org
 Reactivation of the 94th Division
 Photos of the 94th Division Reactivation Ceremony, 17 October 2009, Ft. Lee, VA

094th Infantry Division, U.S.
Military units and formations in Massachusetts
Military units and formations established in 1918
Infantry Division, U.S. 094
1918 establishments in the United States
Training divisions of the United States Army
Infantry divisions of the United States Army in World War II
United States Army divisions of World War I